Bracebridge (Tinks) Aerodrome  is a private aerodrome located on Browning Island in Lake Muskoka,  west southwest of Bracebridge, Ontario, Canada.

See also

 List of airports in the Bracebridge area

References

Registered aerodromes in Ontario
Transport in Bracebridge, Ontario